Bombus fernaldae, the Fernald's cuckoo bumblebee, is a species of cuckoo bumblebee having only males and queens, but no worker bees. The females place their eggs in the nest of the confusing bumblebee (Bombus perplexus) or the red-belted bumblebee (Bombus rufocinctus), which raise the larvae. Fernald's cuckoo bumblebees visit flowers of Potentilla, Rubus, clovers, and goldenrods.

References

Bumblebees
Insects described in 1911